Fagner Leite de Siqueira (born 10 September 1988), commonly known as Fagner, is a Brazilian footballer who plays as a midfielder.

Career statistics

References

External links

1988 births
Living people
Brazilian footballers
Association football midfielders
Campeonato Brasileiro Série B players
Vila Nova Futebol Clube players
Clube Atlético Linense players
Marília Atlético Clube players
People from Garanhuns
Campeonato Brasileiro Série D players
Sportspeople from Pernambuco